Frank Schaefer (born 26 October 1963, in Cologne) is a German football manager. He took over as head coach of Bundesliga team 1. FC Köln on 24 October 2010. He resigned 27 April 2011. On 12 April 2012, he took over as the head coach for 1. FC Köln again and this time until the end of the season. FC Köln was relegated to 2nd Bundesliga.

Coaching career record

1.Frank Schaefer was interim head coach. Holger Stanislawski was hired as head coach on 14 May 2012.

References

1963 births
Living people
Sportspeople from Cologne
1. FC Köln managers
Bundesliga managers
2. Bundesliga managers
German football managers